Gagea pusilla is a Eurasian plant species  in the lily family. It is native to Italy, Greece, the Balkans, Austria, Hungary, Slovakia, Czech Republic, Ukraine, Belarus, Russia (European Russia, North Caucasus, West Siberia Krai), and Kazakhstan.
 
Gagea pusilla is a bulb-forming perennial herb. Its flowers are yellow.

References

External links
Czech Botany, Gagea pusilla, křivatec nizoučký / krivec nízky in Czech with color photos
Botanik im Bild, Flora von Österreich, Liechtenstein und Südtirol, Zwerg-Gelbstern

pusilla
Flora of Europe
Flora of Asia
Plants described in 1822